Don C. Bowen (born May 7, 1945) is an American politician who served in the South Carolina House of Representatives as a Republican. Bowen represented District 8, which comprises regions of Anderson and Oconee Counties, including the city of Anderson.

Early life
Don Bowen was born May 7, 1945 to Carson and Rebecca Bowen. He later graduated from the University of South Carolina with a B.S. On May 7, 1971, he married Tomilyn Forrester Bowen. He has three children: Amy, Don, Jr., and Ward.

S.C. House of Representatives
Bowen was elected to the South Carolina House of Representatives from District 8 as a Republican in November 2006. He served on the Education and Public Works (2nd Vice-Chairman) and Invitations and Memorial Resolutions (Vice-Chairman) committees. He was defeated by fellow Republican Jonathon D. Hill in a primary election in 2014.

Public life
Chairman, United Way for Bi-Lo Supermarkets
Member, School District One Reform Movement
Chairman, Anderson Area Accountability Association
Appointed to the Anderson County Council to the Anderson Ad Hoc Property Tax Study Committee
South Carolina National Guard (Williamston, SC)

Notes

External links
 https://web.archive.org/web/20111011063643/http://scstatehouse.gov/members/bios/0165909071.html

1945 births
University of South Carolina alumni
Living people
Republican Party members of the South Carolina House of Representatives
Politicians from Charleston, South Carolina